The 1526 battle of Nashinokidaira (梨の木平の戦い) was one of many battles fought between the Takeda and Hōjō clans in Japan's Sengoku period. On 8 July of that year, the battle was won by Takeda Nobutora over Hōjō Ujitsuna.

References
Turnbull, Stephen (1998). 'The Samurai Sourcebook'. London: Cassell & Co.

1526 in Japan
Nashinokidaira
Nashinokidaira